The North Riding Senior Cup is the county cup in the North Riding of Yorkshire. It is administered by the North Riding County FA. According to the current rules of the competition, it is open to all clubs whose first affiliation is with the NRCFA. A team having entered an F.A. Competition, (Challenge Cup, Vase or Trophy), in the current season must compete in the Senior Cup. Clubs can be exempt upon payment of a fee. Therefore, the lowest tier for compulsory entry are Northern League Division Two, Northern Counties East Division One or
other Leagues of a similar status.

The current holders are Marske United who won the cup for the second time, 25 years after the first, by beating Thornaby 6–0 in the final at Teesdale Park. The climax of the 2019/20 competition was delayed until August 2020 due to the COVID-19 pandemic, whilst the following season's competition was suspended after the preliminary round and never completed for the same reason.

The winner of the cup goes on to compete in the Eric Powell Charity Cup against the Winners of the Durham Challenge Cup.

Winners

Winners by year
The competition was known as the CLEVELAND CUP between 1881 and 1902. Last win is in bold.

Winners by total wins

Recent competitions are below, Click (show) to reveal all rounds.

2005-06

First Preliminary Round

Second Preliminary Round

Quarter Finals

Semi-Finals

Final

2006-07

First Preliminary Round

Second Preliminary Round

Quarter Finals

Semi-Finals

Final

2007-08

First Preliminary Round

Second Preliminary Round

Quarter Finals

Semi-Finals

Final

2008-09

First Round

Second Round

Quarter Finals

Semi-Finals

Final

2009-10

First Round

Second Round

Third Round

Quarter Finals

Semi-Finals

Final

2010-11

Round 1

Quarter Final

Semi Final

Final

2011-12

Round 1

Round 2

Quarter Finals

Semi-finals

Final

2012-13

Round 1

Quarter Finals

Semi-finals

Final

2013-14

Preliminary Round

Round 1

Quarter finals

Semi-finals

Final

2014-15

Preliminary Round

First Round

Quarter Finals

Semi Finals

Final

2015-16

Note - Number in brackets indicates tier in English football league system for this season.

Preliminary Round

First Round

Quarter Finals

Semi-finals

Final

2016-17

Preliminary Round

First Round

Quarter Finals

Semi-finals

Final

2017-18

Preliminary Round

First Round

Quarter-finals

Semi-finals

Final

2018-19 

Preliminary Round

First Round

Quarter-finals

Semi-finals

Final

2019-20 

Preliminary Round

First round

Quarter-final

Semi-finals

Final

2020-21 

Preliminary Round

First Round

COMPETITION CANCELLED AFTER PRELIMINARY ROUND

2021-22

First Round

Second Round

Quarter-final

Semi-finals

Final

2022-23

First Round

Second Round

Quarter-finals

Semi-finals

Final

References

 

County Cup competitions
Football in North Yorkshire
Football competitions in Yorkshire